The Mumbai Challengers was an Indian professional basketball team based in Mumbai, Maharashtra. The Challengers last competed in the United Basketball Alliance as a member of the North Division along with three other teams. They are one of two UBA teams located in Maharashtra, the other is Pune Peshwas. The team was established in 2015 with the inception of the UBA.

The Challengers won their first UBA Championship in Season 4 after defeating the Punjab Steelers in the semifinals and the Bengaluru Beast in the finals series.

The only player that has played all four UBA Seasons for the Challengers is Karanpal Singh, while Jagdeep Singh Bains, Nikhil Kumar, Prudhvi Reddy and Dildar have all been on the roster since season 2.

Season-by-season record

Players
Mumbai Challengers Season 4 roster

Prominent players

Head coaches

Assistant coaches

References

UBA Pro Basketball League
Basketball teams established in 2015
Basketball teams in India
Sports leagues established in 2015